Det Liberale Folkeparti can refer to:

 Liberal People's Party (Norway)
 Liberal People's Party (Norway, 1972)